Seamus Kelly (born 6 May 1974) is an Irish former footballer who played as a goalkeeper.

His brother Pádraic played as a keeper for Offaly for many years. Seamus also played as a goalkeeper for Offaly minor team in 1992.

Career
Seamus signed for UCD in the summer of 1993, making his League of Ireland debut on 19 September, from hometown club Tullamore Town and established himself as one of the league's best keepers before joining Cardiff City in 1998 as cover for Jon Hallworth. Kelly began his Cardiff career on the bench but was called upon at the end of the 1998–99 season when Hallworth broke two ribs in a match against Leyton Orient. He played in the final five matches of the season, making his debut in a 1–0 win over Southend United, helping the club clinch promotion to Division Two. The following season saw the same scenario at the opposite end of the table as Kelly played in the final six matches of the year but was unable to help the club avoid relegation, being released at the end of the season.

Kelly returned to Dublin to sign for St Patrick's Athletic. After 3 seasons in Inchicore, Stephen Kenny took him to Bohemians where he challenged for the #1 spot with Matt Gregg. Kelly was first choice during Bohemians' UEFA Champions League campaign in 2003 but never made the goalkeeping spot his own during his time at Dalymount Park. Kelly joined Longford Town from Bohs in 2005 and played a crucial role in the club's FAI Cup run in 2007 and also their gallant battle against relegation that same season. Following a mass exodus of players at the end of that season, Kelly remained on as one of only three players for the 2008 season (the others being Daire Doyle and Alan O'Riordan) as then manager Aaron Callaghan attempted to assemble a squad almost from scratch. Due to persistent back problems, Kelly retired during the summer of 2008. In 2010, he became Goalkeeping coach with Sheloburne.

Honours
UCD
Leinster Senior Cup (2): 1994–95, 1995–96

References

1974 births
Living people
Republic of Ireland association footballers
League of Ireland players
University College Dublin A.F.C. players
Cardiff City F.C. players
St Patrick's Athletic F.C. players
Bohemian F.C. players
Longford Town F.C. players
English Football League players
Association football goalkeepers
Gaelic footballers who switched code
Offaly inter-county Gaelic footballers
Sportspeople from County Offaly
People from Tullamore, County Offaly